Jackson Ferguson (born 23 October 1992) is a former professional Australian rules footballer who played for the St Kilda Football Club in the Australian Football League (AFL). He was recruited by the club in the 2011 rookie draft with pick 72. Ferguson made his debut in round 10, 2013, against  at Etihad Stadium. He was delisted at the conclusion of the 2013 season.

References

External links

1992 births
Living people
St Kilda Football Club players
Australian rules footballers from New South Wales
Pennant Hills Australian Football Club players
Sandringham Football Club players
Waratah Football Club players
East Coast Eagles players